Soul Mate is a 2016 Chinese romantic drama film directed by Derek Tsang, based on the novel of the same name by Anni Baobei. It stars Zhou Dongyu and Sandra Ma. It was released in China on September 14, 2016.

Plot 
Thirty year-old working woman Li Ansheng's life in Shanghai is suddenly disrupted by the publication of a novel, entitled "Qiyue and Ansheng", a chronicle of her friendship with Qi Yue during her youth. Coupled with an accidental encounter with Su Jia Ming, a past love, her long repressed memories are unleashed with the force of a tsunami. The two girls seemed destined to become friends from the moment they entered high school. Though they were unseparable and believed that their bond would last for the rest of their lives, the cruelty of youth eventually led them to separate paths. Even more shocking is the discovery of a long buried secret shared by the women - a secret that serves as an emblem of their youth and the proof of their friendship.

Cast
 Zhou Dongyu as Li Ansheng 
 Sandra Ma as Lin Qiyue
 Toby Lee as Su Jiaming

Reception
On Rotten Tomatoes the film has an approval rating of 100% based on 9 reviews.

Edmund Lee of South China Morning Post commended the film for transcending its potentially cloying premise to tell a story of friendship and love that’s at once melancholy and very emotional. Both Zhou and Ma were credited for the film's success with their skillful displays of raw emotion.

Soul Mate received 7 nominations at the annual Taipei Golden Horse Film Festival and Awards in 2016, and made history with a joint Best Actress win.

Accolades

References

2016 romantic drama films
Chinese romantic drama films
Alibaba Pictures films
Huaxia Film Distribution films
Films based on Chinese novels
Chinese teen films
Chinese coming-of-age films
2010s Mandarin-language films